The Menominee Park Zoo is a free, small  zoo located in Oshkosh, Wisconsin, within Menominee Park, operated by the Oshkosh Zoological Society.

Menominee Park is the city's largest park located on the near north side of Oshkosh on Lake Winnebago. Within Menominee Park,  the zoo is surrounding the lagoon at the center of the park. The address for the zoo is 520 Pratt Trail, off of E. Merritt Avenue.

The zoo was founded in 1945. A couple donated funds to allow free access starting in 2006.

The zoo typically houses between 30 and 50 animals, including many different kinds of otters, elk, wolves, tortoises, birds, and some other seasonal animals. Peacocks roam freely around the zoo.

References

External links

Zoos in Wisconsin
Oshkosh, Wisconsin
Protected areas of Winnebago County, Wisconsin